Antony Firingee is a 1967 Indian biographical musical drama film directed by Sunil Bannerjee, starring Uttam Kumar and Tanuja on lead. It is a biopic based on the life of Anthony Firingee (Hensman Anthony), a Bengali language folk poet of Portuguese origin.Antony Firingee was a Portuguese-Indian who became a famous Bengali poet musician and fell in love with Nirupoma. She agreed to marry him after revealing her tragic history. But his fame was not enough to overcome their ostracisation and tragedy struck again.

This musical drama is purely based on the life of a Portuguese named Hensman Anthony. Anthony (Uttam Kumar) came to India and made Bengal his home. The Bengali folk songs and traditional music changed his life forever. Such was the effect that he even looked Bengal as his motherland. He even married a Hindu widow Nirupama (Tanuja). But he couldn’t protect himself against the dirty orthodoxy believes that used to plague the land in that period. His wife was burnt to death because Antony was planning for a Durga Puja which was termed blasphemy by the then Brahmins. However, in real life, despite the odds of the society, Anthony and his wife lived happily and died natural deaths. That’s the only difference the 1967 film had.

After the film's release, the poet name became "famous". The film was noted for its music, sung by Manna Dey and Sandhya Mukhopadhyay, composed by Anil Bagchi & lyrics by Gouri Prasanna Majumdar and others. The film become all time blockbuster and highest grossing bengali film in 1967.

Plot
Hensman Anthony, commonly known as Antony Firingee became a Bengali language poet in the early part of the 19th century. The story revolves around his love for a courtesan Shakila, who he later marries and faces social ostracization.

Cast
Uttam Kumar ...  Anthony Firingee
Tanuja ...  Nirupoma
 Lolita Chatterjee ... Marina (as Lalita Chattopadhyay)
 Bhanu Bandopadhyay ... Haripada
 Jahor Roy ... Ananda Babu 
 Asit Baran ... Bhola Moira
 Haridhan Mukherjee ... Thakurdas Singha (as Haridhan Mukhopadhyay)
 Haradhan Bannerjee ... Kelly Antony (as Haradhan Bandyopadhyay)
 Kamal Majumdar ... Ram Basu 
 Mani Srimani ... Gorakshanath  
Chhaya Devi ... Antony's mother  
Ruma Guha Thakurta ... Jogweswari 
 Soma Chowdhury ...Amina
 Kajal Gupta...Durga
 Jiben Bose

Soundtrack

Anil Bagchi is the music director of the film, while Aloknath Dey is the assistant music director. Many of the songs were critically and commercially successful.

Lyricist Gouri Prasanna Majumdar, Pranab Roy, Bholanath Nayak, Thakurdas Singha.

Playback singers are Manna Dey, Sandhya Mukherjee, Adhir Bagchi, Alok Bagchi, Tarun Bandyopadhyay, Shyamal Chakraborty, Chhaya Dey, Ruma Guha Thakurta, Malabika Kanan, Salil Mitra, Manabendra Mukherjee, Chitto Mukhopadhyay, Swapna Roy.

Selected track list

Production
Anthony Firingi was based on the real life of Portuguese-Bengali folk poet Hensman Anthony. Written and directed by Sunil Bandyopadhyay. The film shooting held in Midnapore district at that time, where the film. set made. The Durga Dalan of Raibari of Jara dynasty, the Zamindar Palace and the Natmandir (Eshtablished by Ram Gopal Ray) in front of it which was showing in the film that is photographed. Uttamkumar himself acted here. The film also shooted in real location of Chanrakona, Jara Palace and also in Anthony Kalibari. The film also shoot The picture here can be seen in the scene of the famous folk poet's fight between Anthony and Vela Moira which held actually in 19th century. 

Tanuja acted in this film as Nirupa with Uttam Kunar. This is the second Bengali film of her and also the second film where Uttam Tanuja work together. They worked before in the 1963 blockbuster film Deya Neya. Here Manna Dey playback for Uttam Kumar in all the songs because that time there is ego clash and brawl between Uttam and Hemanta Kumar. Hemanta who sang for Uttam most of the time and there pair is most popular in Bengali cinema. After the film Manna Dey song most song for Uttam.

Reception
The film is considered as one of the best film ever made on real life incident. Uttam Kumar gave the new life to this character and the poet name become famous after this film. Hindustan Standard kept this film on Top five iconic of Uttam Kumar. The film also remembered for it's outstanding music and Uttam Manna Dey combination. They worked before in the blockbuster film Sankhyabela in 1966. But this film gave their pair a breakthrough. 

The film released at 1967 Durga Puja occasion in West Bengal and became all time blockbuster hit. It's ran over 100 days in theater. It's also become highest grossing bengali film in 1967

In 24th edition of Kolkata International Film Festivals (KIFF) Antony Firingee was showed on the opening theme.

Spin off
Anthony Firingee character was again including in a film in 2014 named as Jatishwaar. Which is showing the re born of Hensman Anthony. The film was made by National Award winner director Srijit Mukherjee. Starring Prosenjit Chatterjee in double role as Hensman Anthony and Kushal Hazra. The film successful and wide praised by critics and also won four National Award of 2014.

Awards
National Film Award
1968 : Uttam Kumar won the National Film Award for Best Actor at the 15th National Film Award (1968) for his performances in Anthony Firingee and Chiriyakhana.

Bengal Film Journalists' Association Award
1968 : Bengal Film Journalists' Association - Best Male Playback Singer - Manna Dey
1968 : Bengal Film Journalists' Association - Best Lyricist Award - Gouri Prasanna Majumder

References

External links

1967 films
Bengali-language Indian films
Films featuring a Best Actor National Award-winning performance
Indian biographical films
Films set in the 19th century
Films set in West Bengal
1960s Bengali-language films
1960s biographical films